Eddyville may refer to:

 Eddyville, California
 Eddyville, Illinois
 Eddyville, Iowa
 Eddyville, Kentucky
 Eddyville, Nebraska
 Eddyville, Oregon
 Eddyville, New York in Ulster County